Kurbaan is a 2009 Indian Hindi-language crime-thriller film directed by Rensil D'Silva and produced by Karan Johar under Dharma Productions. It is based on a story by Johar who co-wrote the screenplay with D'Silva. Starring Saif Ali Khan and Kareena Kapoor, the story revolves around Avantika Ahuja (Kapoor), a psychology professor in New York who returns to Delhi, India to caretake her ailing father and develops a relationship with Sreeram (Khan). Avantika and Sreeram fall in love, get married, and leave for the United States, where she discovers that he is not Sreeram, but Ehsaan and his family is linked to Islamic terrorist groups after witnessing the house arrest, domestic abuse and murder of now family member Salma (Nauheed Cyrusi). The film's backdrop on global terrorism forms the crux.

The original story was conceptualized by Johar, who wanted D'Silva to direct it. In his directorial debut, D'Silva framed the script through the lens of the female protagonist, the romance between Khan and Kapoor, the thriller element, and a social message. The film was shot across Philadelphia, Brooklyn, New York City, Delhi and Mumbai between January 2009 to June 2009. The background score and soundtrack album are composed by the duo Salim–Sulaiman. The song sequences were choreographed by Vaibhavi Merchant. Anurag Kashyap and lyricist Niranjan Iyengar have penned the dialogues.

Kurbaan released on 20 November 2009 and received positive reviews from critics, with praise for its direction, screenplay, soundtrack, and performances of the cast, with particular praise directed towards Kapoor's performance. However, despite critical acclaim, it was declared a flop by Box Office India.

At the 55th Filmfare Awards, Kurbaan received 2 nominations – Best Actress (Kapoor) and Best Male Playback Singer (Sonu Nigam & Salim Merchant for "Shukran Allah").

Plot
Avantika Ahuja, a psychology professor living in the United States, returns to Delhi after her father falls ill. While in Delhi, she meets Sreeram Nath, a university professor from Mumbai; the two become friends and fall in love. Avantika receives an invitation to return to work in the United States. Sreeram readily agrees to emigrate for her. The couple are married and living in America. Avantika helps Sreeram in getting a job, and he is appointed as a professor to teach "Islam and the Modern World" at the same university. The pair live a happy life in a quiet suburb populated by many South Asian families.

Salma, Avantika's neighbour, is effectively being confined in her own home by her husband, Hakil. She manages to inform Avantika about her situation of house arrest and requests her to contact Rehana, a friend and TV reporter. Avantika meets with Rehana and her boyfriend Riyaz, a Muslim American journalist who has just arrived from Iraq. They discuss Salma's problem to conclude that Salma is probably the victim of domestic violence. Rehana plans a meeting with Salma, but is unable to meet her since she is leaving for Iraq, as part of a United Nations envoy.

Meanwhile, Avantika is overjoyed when she finds out that she is pregnant. While waiting for Sreeram, she takes a walk around her street close to her home. Overhearing voices, she decides to investigate and finds out that a group of men from her neighborhood, led by the family elder Bhaijaan, are planning a mission. They aim to bomb the plane that Rehana is travelling in, since it is carrying a large group of diplomats and media personnel. Avantika realises they are part of a terrorist group and also comes across Salma's dead body. The men see her and chase her to her house, where she meets Sreeram. At first, he consoles her, but soon reveals that he is not actually Sreeram. Sreeram is actually Ehsaan and also, he is a part of the terrorist group. Avantika realizes that she is nothing but a pawn in Sreeram's (Ehsaan's) game - he married her to legitimately obtain residency in the United States.

Bhaijaan asks Ehsaan to kill Avantika since she is now a liability, but after learning that she is pregnant, Ehsaan decides not to. Ehsaan keeps Avantika captive in their home and threatens to kill her father in India if she tries to inform anyone of what she knows. Avantika manages to make a phone call, and calls Rehana in order to warn her. The call goes to voice mail, and it is too late; Rehana has already boarded the flight, and the bomb has already been planted. The plane explodes, killing Rehana and all others on board.

A heartbroken Riyaz finds Avantika's voice message for Rehana, and begins his own quest to uncover the real culprits behind the flight bombing. Going undercover, Riyaz joins Ehsaan's lectures and soon befriends him. Avantika and the other wives of the group are watched over by Aapa, Bhaijaan's wife. Aapa explains the reasons for Jihad to Avantika, and also reveals that Ehsaan was an Afghani man with no political ideology, until his first wife and son were killed by American bombs. Riyaz engages in a passionate debate with other students regarding the topic of Islam, and Ehsaan is impressed. While trying to dispose of Salma's decomposing body, Hakil and Ehsaan attract the attention of the police. Ehsaan kills Hakil and the surrounding policemen, and sets the car on fire. Salma's partially burnt body is found, and the FBI distributes pictures of her in order to learn her identity.

Ehsaan finds Riyaz to be a perfect replacement for Hakil. He introduces him to Bhaijaan, who is initially suspicious of the new recruit. He tests Riyaz by ordering him to shoot at a random man serving at a fast food counter. Riyaz is reluctant but follows through; however, it turns out there was no bullet in the gun, thus leaving the man unharmed. Having passed the test, Ehsaan makes Riyaz a part of their next mission to bomb several subway stations in New York.

Riyaz and Avantika begin to work together to foil the plan and bring down the terrorist group. Riyaz sets up a meeting with the FBI for the next day, but his plan is derailed when one of the men sees Salma's picture, and Bhaijaan decides to bring the date of the mission forward.

The group goes ahead with their plan - the women travel together with Aapa, and the men have three bombs between them, to be detonated at separate stations. While on the subway, Riyaz's colleague bumps into him and accidentally reveals his real identity to Ehsaan and Bhaijaan. Riyaz tries to escape and, in the chaos, shoots Bhaijaan. Before dying, Bhaijaan informs Ehsaan that there are three more bombs, which were placed in the bags of the women, unknown to them. One bomb is with Avantika, who is being escorted by Aapa, with the other women. Realising that both Avantika and his unborn child will die, Ehsaan decides to let Riyaz go, and sets out to find Avantika.

Riyaz informs the FBI of the situation, and they rush to each station, trying to find both the men and women. They are able to safely retrieve the explosives from the women, while the one of the men detonates his bombs. The other is caught before he can detonate his bomb and swallows a cyanide capsule hidden in his mouth. Ehsaan kills Aapa in order to free Avantika, and he admits that he loves her and asks her to take care of their child. Ehsaan manages to disarm the last bomb, but is fatally wounded as he escapes from three policemen who were chasing him. Before leaving, Avantika asks Ehsaan, is Ehsaan his real name or it is also fake name like Sreeram. Then Ehsaan is reveals to be Khalid. As she leaves the train, she hears the gunshot of Khalid committing suicide by his own gun.

Cast

Production

Development 
In February 2008, Khan and Kapoor were confirmed as leads for the film. Kapoor called her role challenging and hinted of John Abraham featuring in the film. In December 2008, UTV Motion Pictures acquired the distribution rights of the film. In an interview with Rediff, D'Silva agreed that its Karan Johar's story. Johar told him about the film and for the next few months, D'Silva couldn't get it off his head. D'Silva learnt from a common friend that Karan loved the story, so he asked D'Silva to direct it. D' Silva went on to add that the film is a very intricate story from India to the US, pondering into state of Islam in the modern world. He acknowledged it as a woman's story,  where Avantika Ahuja (Kapoor) plays a psychology lecturer living in New York. She comes to India to take care of her ailing father and joins Delhi University. She meets Ehsaan Khan (Khan), they fall in love, marry and go back to the US. Post the movement, things with them turn topsy-turvy. D'Silva cleared that the film was not based on 9/11 attacks.

When Johar was quizzed on the film script bearing resemblance to Arlington Road (1999), he stated it does have theme of terrorism. As per D'Silva, the film story has three elements - the romance between Khan and Kapoor; the thriller element; and it also carries a social message. In January 2009, Anurag Kashyap stated the title of the film as Jihaad in an interview with The Telegraph. In an interview with Livemint, D'Silva was quoted saying: "The character played by Khan is an “urban, educated, liberal" Muslim, in love with a Hindu girl played by Kapoor." He noted a fair urban shift in the cinema on portraying Muslim characters. Adding further on Khan's character; which was not "the decadent, sozzled nawab cavorting with courtesans; not “Khan chacha", the benevolent other, or wearing a Faiz topi".

Casting 
Shanoo Sharma was roped in as the casting director. Kher plays the role of an Afghan for the first time. She worked on her dialect and at times, arranged for her own clothes. She was clear about how she wanted to look and play the role. Before Oberoi was finalized, Akshaye Khanna and Irrfan Khan were considered. In an interview with The Telegraph, Aki Narula confirmed designing the costumes for the characters. Tara Sharma was approached for a role but rejected due to personal reasons. In an interview with Subhash K Jha, Oberoi was quoted saying: "When I read the script, my first question to Karan was, 'Why me?' He laughed and said it was because I was talented and I could pull it off. And I love working with Kareena. We share a great rapport after Yuva (2004) and Omkara (2006)." The casting was finalized by Karan Johar.

Costumes 
Kareena Kapoor
Aki Narula discussed with D'Silva on the screenplay and locales to design the costumes. As he knew filming schedules in Delhi around October (winter season), he researched the different styles by going to the colleges, canteens, and the local markets. For Kapoor, he designed full sleeve t-shirts with V-necks and dark-colored ankle-length churidars with Jaipuri work, mojri and scarves. Her costumes featured rust, burgundy, olive green, blue and purple colors, as observed during the Delhi University scenes. Accessories worn were silver oxidized jewels. In the track "Shukran Allah", Kapoor's salwar was of 60 metres of fabric. As the plot progresses to the U.S., Narula kept the leads' outfits with the ideology that "when traveling abroad, you'd carry some clothes with you". He avoided designing or collaborating with U.S. brands to keep the transitions real. Additionally, Narula gave her Zara trench coats, jeans, and track pants, while sporting her sacred pendant. Towards the terror plot, she dons more of grey, blue, and blacks costumes.

Saif Ali Khan
Narula kept Khan's costumes simple with jeans and shirts in blue, grey, and green with V-neck sweaters apart from pathani kurtas with jeans. After moving to the U.S. too, his outfits introduced were long jackets in blue and grey. During the terror scenes, he was made to wear darker colors in leather. Johar, D'Silva, and Narula decided that a stubble or beard gives grittiness to the character. Hence, Khan is seen unshaven.

Om Puri, Kirron Kher, Vivek Oberoi, Dia Mirza
Puri was given suit vests to don throughout the film. Intentionally, all his pathani kurtas were washed by a dhobi to get the worn look, which he noticed. Kher received long tunic, long skirts, and shawls wrapped around her head to justify her as an Afghan. She was very involved with her outfits. She had her ideas that she shared with Narula and worked together on her looks. Oberoi was given a lot of dark jeans, t-shirts, sweaters, wind cheaters in navy blue, grey, olive green, and black leather jackets, all from Zara and H&M, while Mirza was given short skirts with jackets and work bags, in black formal work outfits.

Filming 
Principal photography commenced in November 2008 in Philadelphia. A set was erected to shoot the replica of a terrorist attack. The subway tube scene was shot underground where the train was hired. Khan noted the cold weather conditions to an added difficulty in getting the pitch and tone right while delivering dialogues. The characters were shooting in sync sound. There were 80 people in the unit. Also during the shoot, Kapoor fainted on the sets owing to the cold weather. Some scenes were filmed in Brooklyn. A three-minute erotic scene between Khan and Kapoor (through the song "Rasiya") was requested to be removed from the film print by Kapoor for personal reasons. She'd agreed to shoot for it because it was integral to the script. In an interview with Press Trust of India, she was quoted saying: "“I've done kissing scenes earlier, but the lovemaking scene is explicit by my yardstick.” Khan flew down to India due to health reasons on 22 December 2008. D'Silva made an attempt to film in U.K. but cancelled due to lack of permissions and security issues. Filming took place in areas around Rajpath and Delhi Haat in February 2009. The song "Shukran Allah" was shot close to Humayun's Tomb with 2 lakh people witnessing the shoot. However, owing to the lead pair's popularity, there were a huge number of people who had come to see them especially. The areas of Jama Masjid and Janpath were always too high to shoot. Hence, barring a few shots, wide-angle shoots were cancelled enforcing recreation of scenes planned in Delhi for Mumbai between mid-March to April 2009. The Mumbai scenes bore continuity to the ones filmed in U.S. In May 2009, filming continued in New York. Johar's production house was accused of not paying its employees on the film's sets in US. In August 2009, the film was set to enter its last schedule in Pune. However, it was cancelled owing to the outbreak of swine flu. As per D'Silva, Oberoi's scenes formed about 80% of the film. His character was central to the drama. Oberoi used to visit D'Silva's room in Philadelphia every night to discuss diction, dialogues and looks. Oberoi also had the most single shots in the film. At times, the treatment of a few scenes were rewritten by Johar. Filming and post-production was wrapped up by November 2009.

Soundtrack

The original score and soundtrack for the film were composed by Salim–Sulaiman. Salim Merchant agreed that the songs have a Sufi touch in them, as requested by Johar. The duo were approached while they were composing the now-shelved Koochie Koochie Hota Hai. However, the composers were focused on the original score. Merchant pointed out that "Shukran Allah" was based on Khan's character where he is paying gratitude to God for giving him the love of this life. The Arabic lines translate to, 'Thank You, Allah, and All the Praise in this World is For You'. Originally a prayer, the composers decided to turn it into a love song. As per Merchant, "Ali Maula" was a chanting kind of song, sung by him. When they composed the song, they were unsure of its fitment in any film. They played it to Johar and D'Silva, who approved it for Kurbaan. In an interview with Radio Mirchi, Kapoor called the track as the turning point of the film. Sulaiman Merchant called the track "Rasiya" as 'passionate', a song picturized on an intimate scene between Khan and Kapoor. Being pictured on a married couple, they kept maturity in the composition keeping a balance of sensuality.

The soundtrack received mixed-to-positive reviews from music critics. Critic Ruchika Kher of Hindustan Times assigned the album score of 3.5 out of 5 and stated: "On the whole, the album is worth checking out. Salim-Sulaiman have done a great job yet again." Ankit Ojha of Planet Bollywood reviewed: "Overall, Kurbaan is a good album which has a combination of some fine Sufi lyrics and some surprisingly enjoyable situational tracks that make for a more-rounded album (despite the inclusion of a minimal number of songs). Here, the urbanization goes for a toss to give more emphasis to the melody as a whole. Worth-a-buy!" Sukanya Verma of Rediff rated the album 3 on 5 noted, "A compact soundtrack with a mix of sweet-sounding and soul-stirring melodies to offer, Kurbaan is worth sacrificing a few bucks at a music shop counter." Critics based at Bollywood Hungama noted: "Kurbaan is a quality album all the way and clearly the best that Salim & Sulaiman have offered since Fashion (2008)."

Track listing

Release

Theatrical 
Kurbaan's teaser trailer was released along with Wake Up Sid, which released on 2 October 2009.

Censorship 
The Central Board of Film Certification India awarded the film with an A (Restricted to adults) release certificate. Vinayak Azad (The Regional Officer of the Censor Board) noted the setting of the film, which is terrorism, led to the decision. Rensil D’Silva, the director of the film, tried convincing for a ‘U’ or ‘U/A’ certificate, however, there were no changes.

Critical reception
On review aggregator Rotten Tomatoes, the film has 4 reviews and all four are positive. Kurbaan received positive reviews from critics in India and overseas.

In his review for Economic Times, Gaurav Malani wrote: "Kurbaan is an outcome of sensitive filmmaking, Technically, the film is proficient in all departments. Undoubtedly. the narrative bears a striking resemblance to Kabir Khan's New York (2009), both in terms of the theme and setting of the story and structure of the screenplay." He gave the film a score of 3 (out of 5). Critic Taran Adarsh in his review for Bollywood Hungama gave the film 4 (out of 5), noting "Kurbaan is embellished with superlative performances. Khan is extraordinary in a role that only proves his versatility once again. He claimed the film as "the most powerful film to come out of the Hindi film industry in 2009, so far. The film has a captivating plot, gripping screenplay, superb performances and a riveting climax." Rajeev Masand from CNN-IBN noted "It's a compelling thriller that doesn’t shy away from touching prickly issues, director Rensil D’Silva makes a confident debut with a film that is respectable and engaging." He assigned a score of 3 on 5. Shubhra Gupta of The Indian Express rated the film 3 out of 5, noted: "Written sharply by producer Karan Johar, and directed intelligently by first-timer Rensil D'Silva, the film enunciates, with admirable clarity, contemporary conundrums." A review by Anil Sinanan for Time Out denoted, "However, this has to be applauded for exploring a topical and sensitive subject in the widest commercial context. Interesting, entertaining and solidly executed." The score assigned by her to the film was 3 on 5. Nikhat Kazmi of The Times of India rated the film 3.5 on 5, adding on 'Kudos to Karan Johar for shifting gears completely and entering into serious territory.' Ram Tarat of Future Movies UK, pointed "A chilling yet appropriately tempered and charismatic antidote to your archetypal seasonal fare, Kurbaan is a gripping white knuckle ride that turns at all the right places for the ultimate thrill ride." He added on a score of 4 (out of 5) Baradwaj Rangan, his review for the film pointed: "It is yet another story about yet another terrorist. The hardware is there, but where’s the heart? Kurbaan wears its hot-button topicality proudly, like a gleaming medal that’s been well and truly earned. And the members of the cast do most of the earning, each one entrusted with disbursing a bit of the sugar-coated bitter medicine."

Box office
The film was released in 1250 screens across India. The first day box office collections were est. ₹40 million. Despite pre-release hype and controversy, it opened to average numbers. Also, the first day occupancy was 40%, below the expected average of 70%. The film's business in territories like Delhi, Lucknow, Bangalore and Hyderabad managed 50 to 60 per cent occupancy. However, the A (Restricted to Adult) certificate from the Censor Board limited the audiences. The film went on to earn est. ₹136 million in India in the first weekend of its release. The worldwide first weekend collection were around est. ₹242 million. However, the first week's collections improved meagre to est. ₹197 million in India whereas worldwide figure being est. ₹348 million. The all time worldwide gross was recorded as est. ₹429 million.

The film underperformed and hence, was declared as a flop by Box Office India. In a year-end box office performance review by DNA, the film was rounded in the category of big-budget movies. Siddharth Roy Kapur (distribution rights) admitted that 2009 was a tough year for the Indian film industry. Producer Mohan Kumar added: "Movies which did good business at the box office this year were fun films [...] even though Saif-Kareena starrer Kurbaan had a backdrop of terrorism, it did not do well."

Satellite rights
Kurbaan first premiered on Colors, following which it subsequently began being broadcast on UTV Movies. A decade later, Star India acquired the rights, and retains them with several other films such as Wake Up Sid (2009).

Awards

Controversies

Film release and theatrical poster 
A petitioner, Mohammed Ali, filed a petition in Bombay High Court to stay the release of the movie after claiming two of the songs ("Shukran Allah" and "Ali Maula") were objectionable. However, the Court refused to grant interim relief in a petition seeking a stay on release on the ground that its songs hurt sentiments of the minority community. In a related event, a local court rejected a private complaint seeking to delete an obscene shot (portrayed through the song "Rasiya") in the film showing Kapoor and Khan in partially nude poses. The Magistrate, who rejected the complaint, observed that no offence of alleged obscenity was made out against the film makers and actors. In another event, where the first poster of the film represented Khan bare-chested and Kapoor backless, she stated: "There is love, passion and violence - all combined in the film and what better way than to show it through a single still? You too would agree that there is nothing sleazy or vulgar about it." Women representing the Shiv Sena wrapped a saree around the film's poster during a defense. The party objected that the backless image shown in posters is against the Hindu culture of the state, and hence should have been immediately withdrawn.

Lawsuits 
Dharma Productions tied up Australia-based Swish Films to film a few scenes in Philadelphia and then left owing money to hundreds of local actors and vendors. Both Dharma and Swish Films were sued, according to documents filed in Common Pleas Court. The lawsuit sought in excess of $150,000 to be paid to in unpaid services and expenses for 25 of the vendors. The lawsuit requested restraining order that prevented the representatives of Dharma Productions from leaving the US with its assets and the shot footage. There were paid cheques that bounced, leaving more than $500,000 in unpaid bills.

Dharma then offered certain workers half the amount they are owed, whereas for the rest, they paid the full amount owed, including to the City of Philadelphia and Teamsters Local 107.

Dubbing 
In a few released prints of the film, a scene where Oberoi, Khan, and their university classmates interact in the film, the white students are speaking in English to a discussion on Islamic fundamentalism and America, a crux of the theme. D'Silva was miffed with the UTV to dub those lines in Hindi. However, initially, UTV assured D'Silva that dubbing was only for a very small number of prints that would go in the Hindi belt where English was not understood. Instead, UTV dubbed the sequence in 500 prints of Kurbaan. However, Siddharth Roy Kapur added that being an important scene of the core debate, in order to not alienate a non-English speaking audience, they dubbed the scene in certain areas.

References

External links
 
 
 
 

2009 films
2000s Hindi-language films
Indian action thriller films
2009 action thriller films
UTV Motion Pictures films
Indian films about revenge
Indian films set in New York City
Indian vigilante films
2000s vigilante films
Films shot in Mumbai